The 1958 season was the forty-seventh season for Santos FC.

References

External links
Official Site 

Santos
1958
1958 in Brazilian football
1958 in South American football